Francisco Guerrero Cárdennas (born 19 June 1934 in Pozo Alcón, Jaén) is a former Spanish football player.

External links
Profile at LFP 

1934 births
Living people
Spanish footballers
Valencia CF players
La Liga players
Association football forwards
Elche CF players